The Puerto Rico National Library is the national library of Puerto Rico. It was created in 1967 as the Biblioteca General de Puerto Rico (Puerto Rico General Library) by Joint Resolution No. 44 of the Puerto Rico Legislature. It opened on April 11, 1973.  In 2003 it was renamed Biblioteca Nacional de Puerto Rico by Act 188 of August 17 of that year. The library is ascribed to the Institute of Puerto Rican Culture.

The Library shares its nineteenth-century classical building, (at one time the Bacardi Rum flagship factory), with the General Archives of Puerto Rico. The Library's specialized collections include the Dominican Collection of leather-bound religious books dating from the 16th-19th centuries, the Eugenio Maria de Hostos Collection, which includes 1,300 digitized manuscripts, and the private collection of Concha Meléndez, literary critic and former professor at the University of Puerto Rico.

The building is located in Old San Juan. It faces the Luis Muñoz Rivera Park. It is fully air‐conditioned and has free Internet access. The Library and Archives share a 119-seat amphitheater at street level where each one has its individual side desk, with an unobstructed view.  The building was listed on the National Register of Historic Places in 1976 under its former name, Carcel de Puerta de Tierra.

References

Bibliography

External links
  
 
  

History of Puerto Rico
Libraries in Puerto Rico
Puerto Rico
Puerto Rican culture
1967 establishments in Puerto Rico
National Register of Historic Places in San Juan, Puerto Rico
Buildings and structures on the National Register of Historic Places in Puerto Rico
Bacardi
Distilleries on the National Register of Historic Places
Industrial buildings completed in 1887
1887 establishments in Puerto Rico
Spanish Revival architecture in Puerto Rico
Libraries established in 1967
Government buildings on the National Register of Historic Places in Puerto Rico
Education in San Juan, Puerto Rico
Industrial buildings and structures on the National Register of Historic Places in Puerto Rico